Adelbert N. Everson (April 12, 1841 – July 23, 1913) was an American soldier who fought in the American Civil War. Everson received the country's highest award for bravery during combat, the Medal of Honor, for his action during the Battle of Five Forks in Virginia on 1 April 1865. He was honored with the award on 10 May 1865.

Biography
Everson was born in Cicero, New York, on 12 April 1841. He enlisted in the 185th New York Infantry. He died on 23 July 1913 and his remains are interred at the Riverside Cemetery in Brewerton, New York.

Medal of Honor citation

See also

List of American Civil War Medal of Honor recipients: A–F

References

1841 births
1913 deaths
People of New York (state) in the American Civil War
Union Army officers
United States Army Medal of Honor recipients
American Civil War recipients of the Medal of Honor